The Pole of Good Government was a centre-right electoral, and later political alliance in Italy, launched at the 1994 general election by Silvio Berlusconi. Its counterpart in Northern Italy was the Pole of Freedoms.

History
The alliance was composed primarily of Forza Italia (FI) and the National Alliance (AN), but also included the Christian Democratic Centre (CCD), Union of the Centre (UdC) and Liberal Democratic Pole (PLD). The Pole of Good Government was present only in most of Southern Italy, while the Pole of Freedoms, composed of Forza Italia and the Lega Nord, without the National Alliance, was present in Northern Italy.

However, the term "Pole of Good Government" (as that of "Pole of Freedoms") had no official character: the logo that identified the coalition included just the symbols of the lists that were part of the alliance (furthermore, this symbol was only present for the election of the Senate).

After the fall of the Berlusconi I Cabinet because of disagreements with the Lega Nord, the alliance ended. In its place, Forza Italia, the National Alliance and Christian Democratic Centre formed another coalition, the Pole for Freedoms, which in 2000, after the re-entry of Lega Nord, was renamed House of Freedoms.

Composition
It was initially composed of the following political parties:

References

Political parties established in 1994
Defunct political party alliances in Italy
1994 establishments in Italy

fr:Pôle des libertés - Pôle du bon gouvernement